The North Long Branch School-Primary No. 3 is located in Long Branch, Monmouth County, New Jersey, United States. The building was built in 1891 and added to the National Register of Historic Places on July 28, 1999.

See also
National Register of Historic Places listings in Monmouth County, New Jersey

References

Buildings and structures in Monmouth County, New Jersey
Colonial Revival architecture in New Jersey
Long Branch, New Jersey
School buildings on the National Register of Historic Places in New Jersey
School buildings completed in 1891
National Register of Historic Places in Monmouth County, New Jersey
New Jersey Register of Historic Places